Pedro Manuel da Mota Pinto (born 8 November 1994) is a Portuguese professional footballer who plays for Angolan club Atlético Petróleos de Luanda as a central defender.

References

External links

Portuguese League profile 

1994 births
Living people
Sportspeople from Vila Nova de Gaia
Portuguese footballers
Association football defenders
Primeira Liga players
Liga Portugal 2 players
Leixões S.C. players
Vitória F.C. players
F.C. Arouca players
Girabola players
Atlético Petróleos de Luanda players
Portuguese expatriate footballers
Expatriate footballers in Angola
Portuguese expatriate sportspeople in Angola